The Commune Council, simply known as the Commune, was the government during the 72-day Paris Commune in 1871. Following elections on 26 March, the municipal council adopted the formal name Paris Commune in its first session, implying a more revolutionary intent. The council declared itself and its name on 28 March at the Hôtel de Ville as a celebratory event. Their first proclamation followed the next day, reminding citizens of their autonomy and warning of civil war. The Commune was supported by the vast majority of Parisians. The Central Committee of the National Guard recognized and relinquished power to the Commune, but continued to organize as the "guardian of the revolution". The two groups exercised a de facto dual sovereignty.

References

Further reading 

 

Paris Commune
Government of Paris